NMTC may refer to:

 New Markets Tax Credit Program
 New Media Technology College
 North Metro Technical College